Ed Greenwood (born July 21, 1959) is a Canadian fantasy writer and the original creator of the Forgotten Realms game world. He began writing articles about the Forgotten Realms for Dragon magazine beginning in 1979, and subsequently sold the rights to the setting to TSR, the creators of the Dungeons & Dragons roleplaying game, in 1986. He has written many Forgotten Realms novels, as well as numerous articles and D&D game supplement books.

Early life and the Forgotten Realms
Greenwood grew up in the upscale Toronto suburb of Don Mills. He began writing stories about the Forgotten Realms as a child, starting in the mid-1960s; they were his "dream space for swords and sorcery stories". Greenwood conceived of the Forgotten Realms as one world in a "multiverse" of parallel worlds which includes the Earth. He imagined such worlds as being the source of humanity's myths and legends.

Greenwood discovered the Dungeons & Dragons game in 1975 and soon became a regular player. He used the Realms as a setting for his campaigns, which centered around the fictional locales of Waterdeep and Shadowdale, locations that would figure prominently in his later writing. According to Greenwood, his players' thirst for detail pushed him to further develop the Forgotten Realms setting: "They want[ed] it to seem real, and work on 'honest jobs' and personal activities, until the whole thing [grew] into far more than a casual campaign."

Beginning with the periodical's 30th issue in 1979, Greenwood published a series of articles set in the Realms in The Dragon magazine, the first of which was about a monster known as The Curst.  Greenwood's articles in The Dragon often featured the wizard Elminster describing magic items, monsters, and spells.

Partnership with TSR
In 1986, the American game publishing company TSR began looking for a new campaign setting for the Advanced Dungeons & Dragons game, and assigned Jeff Grubb to find out more about the setting used by Greenwood in his articles for Dragon magazine. According to Greenwood, Grubb asked him "Do you just make this stuff up as you go, or do you really have a huge campaign world?"; he answered "yes" to both questions. TSR felt that the Forgotten Realms would be a more open-ended setting than the epic Dragonlance setting, and chose the Realms as a ready-made campaign for AD&D 2nd Edition.

Greenwood agreed to work on the project, and began to prepare his Forgotten Realms material for official publication. He sent TSR a few dozen cardboard boxes stuffed with pencil notes and maps, and sold all his rights to the Realms to TSR for a token fee—just $5,000 and a promise to publish Greenwood's novels. The following year, Greenwood and coauthor Jeff Grubb wrote and published the Forgotten Realms Campaign Set (1987).

The campaign setting was a major success, and Greenwood continued to be involved with the evolution of the Forgotten Realms over the next decades. He went on to write numerous Forgotten Realms novels. Many of these center around the wizard Elminster, whom Greenwood has frequently portrayed at conventions and gaming events.

When TSR was in dire financial difficulties in 1996–1997, Greenwood offered to write some material for them for free to help get them back on their feet.  Nothing came of the offer, but after Wizards of the Coast purchased TSR in 1997 and stabilized its finances, CEO Peter Adkison personally called Greenwood at the library he was working at to encourage him to continue writing Realms material.  Greenwood responded he was happy to continue writing for the Realms for as long as he could.

Greenwood feels his work on the Realms that he likes best are "those products that impart some of the richness and color of the Realms, such as the novel I wrote with Jeff Grubb, Cormyr; the Volo's Guides; Seven Sisters; The Code of the Harpers; City of Splendors; and stuff that lots of gamers have found useful, such as Drow of the Underdark and Ruins of Undermountain."

Greenwood has also been contributing editor and creative editor of Dragon magazine.

Personal life and other activities
Greenwood has published over two hundred articles in Dragon Magazine and Polyhedron Newszine, is a lifetime charter member of the Role Playing Game Association (RPGA) network, and has been Gen Con Game Fair guest of honor many times. Greenwood has written over thirty-five novels for TSR, and written, co-written, or contributed to over two hundred books and game products from other publishers. Greenwood has also contributed to The Book of All Flesh (2001), an anthology based on All Flesh Must Be Eaten, and written short stories based on the Silver Age Sentinels role-playing game. Greenwood's Castlemourn setting was published by Margaret Weis Productions. He is co-creator (with fantasy novelist Lynn Abbey) of the Mornmist fantasy setting.

He has also contributed to most Forgotten Realms gaming accessories, and authored many more—including the detailed Volo's Guide series—and continues to DM his own campaign. He writes regular Realmslore columns for the Wizards of the Coast website.

In addition to all these activities, Greenwood works as a library clerk (and sometimes as a librarian) and has edited over a dozen small press magazines. When not appearing at conventions, he lives in an old farmhouse in the countryside of Ontario.

As of 1998, Greenwood lived in applegrowing country on Lake Ontario, still working full-time at the North York Community Library, as he had since 1974, and continued to run his original Waterdeep campaign with the same core group he started with, albeit meeting only sporadically.

Awards and honors
Greenwood won "best player" at the 1984 Gen Con AD&D Open tournament and several Gamer's Choice Awards and Origins Awards for his game design. He was inducted into the Gamer's Choice Hall of Fame in 1992 and the Academy of Adventure Gaming's Hall of Fame in 2003. Order of Cramahe 2017. He received the Port Hope Civic Awards Arts & Culture Award 2019.

Bibliography

 Shandril's Saga
 Spellfire (1987);
 Crown of Fire (1994);
 Hand of Fire (2002)
 The Elminster Series
 Elminster – The Making of a Mage (1994);
 Elminster in Myth Drannor (1997);
 The Temptation of Elminster (1998);
 Elminster in Hell (2001);
 Elminster's Daughter (2004);
 Spellstorm (2015)
 The Shadow of the Avatar Trilogy
 Shadows of Doom (Greenwood novel)|Shadows of Doom (1995);
 Cloak of Shadows (1995);
 All Shadows Fled (1995)
 The Cormyr Saga
 Cormyr: A Novel (1996);
 Death of the Dragon (2000)
 The Harpers
Crown of Fire (1994);
 Stormlight (novel)|Starlight (1996)
 Double Diamond Triangle Saga
 The Mercenaries (novel)|The Mercenaries (1998);
 The Diamond (novel)|The Diamond (1998)
 Sembia
 "The Burning Chalice" - The Halls of Stormweather: A Novel In Seven Parts (2000)
 The Knights of Myth Drannor Trilogy
 Swords of Eveningstar (2006);
 Swords of Dragonfire (August 2007);
 The Sword Never Sleeps (November 2008);
 The Sage of Shadowdale series
 Elminster Must Die (August 2010)
 Bury Elminster Deep (August 2011)
 Elminster Enraged (August 2012)
 The Sundering
 The Herald (2013)
 Other titles
 Silverfall: Stories of the Seven Sisters (1999)
 Death Masks (Forgotten Realms novel)|Death Masks (2016)

Anthology novellas
 "One Comes Unheralded, to Zirta" - originally written in 1967, published in Best of the Realms 2 (2005);
 "Elminster at the Mage Fair" - Realms of Valor (1993);
 "So High A Price" - Realms of Infamy (1994);
 "The Eye of the Dragon" - Realms of Magic (1995);
 "A Slow Day In Skullport" - Realms of the Underdark (1996);
 "The Whispering Crown" - Realms of the Arcane (1997);
 "The Place Where Guards Snore at their Posts" - Realms of the Deep (2000);
 "When Shadows Come Seeking A Throne" - Realms of Shadow (2002)
 "Lord of the Darkways" - Untold Adventures (2011)

Non-Forgotten Realms novels
 Band of Four Series
 The Kingless Land (Tor Books 2000)
 The Vacant Throne (Tor Books 2001)
 A Dragon's Ascension (Tor Books 2002)
 The Dragon's Doom (Tor Books 2003)
 The Silent House: A Chronicle of Aglirta (Tor Books 2004)
 Falconfar Series
 Dark Lord (Ed Greenwood novel)|Dark Lord (Solaris Books 2007)
 Arch Wizard (Solaris Books 2008)
 Falconfar (Solaris Books 2010)
 Novel of Niflheim Series
 Dark Warrior Rising: A Novel of Niflheim (Tor Books 2007)
 Dark Vengeance (Tor Books 2008)
 Pathfinder Tales Series
 The Wizard's Mask (Paizo Publishing 2013)
 The Iron Assassin (Tor Books 2015)
 Hellmaw Series
 Hellmaw: Your World Is Doomed! (The Ed Greenwood Group 2016)
 Hellmaw: Throckmorton's Trick (The Ed Greenwood Group 2017)
 Hellmaw: My Talons In Her Throat (The Ed Greenwood Group 2017)
 Stormtalons Series
 Words Of Unbinding (The Ed Greenwood Group 2016)
 Folklore: The Affliction Series
 Folklore: The Affliction: The Whispering Skull (The Ed Greenwood Group 2017)
 Come Octember  (Haunted Castle Press 2018)

Other fiction anthology contributions
 "The Sword of Dreams" - Tales From Tethedril (1998)
 "The Witch of the Dawn" - Be Afraid! (2000)
 "The Shadow of a Sword" - The Doom of Camelot (2000)
 "One Last, Little Revenge" - The Book of All Flesh (2001)
 "Writhe, Damn You" - Northern Horror (2002)
 "No Stars to Steer By" - Oceans of Space (2002)
 "All One Under the Stars" - The Bakka Anthology (2002)
 "O Silent Knight of Cards" - Be Very Afraid! (2002)
 "The Secret in the Cellar" - The Book of Final Flesh (2003)
 "The Man In The Wall" - Path of the Just (2003)
 "The Fallen Star" - Children of the Rune (2004)
 "Stormsong" - Summoned by Destiny I: Realms of Wonder (2004)
 "The Mad Mohj of Onteth" - The Dragons' Return (2005)
 "Wrathclaw's Wyrmtide" - We Three Dragons (2005)
 "Beowulf and the Wraith" - The Further Adventures of Beowulf: Champion of Middle Earth (2006)
 "It Came From the Swamp" - Astounding Hero Tales (2006)
 "Oroon Rising" - Wizards of the Coast (2006)
 "King Harrowhelm" - Heroes in Training (2007)
 "Secrets" - Dragons of Krynn (2007)
 "Father Maims Best" - Catopolis (2008)
 "What Dreams May Go" - Lilith Unbound (2008)
 "How Fear Came To Ornath" - Worlds of Their Own (2008)
 "A Perfect Night to Watch Detroit Burn" - Grants Pass (2009)
 "Rescuing the Elf Princess Again" - Gamer Fantastic (2009)
 "Edge of Moonglow" - Tesseracts Fifteen: A Case of Quite Curious Tales (2011)
 "Biting a Dead Man's Hand" - First Contact: Digital Science Fiction Anthology 1 (2011)
 "My Silent Slayer" - Heir Apparent: Digital Science Fiction Anthology 4 (2011)
 "Daggers in her Garters" - Beauty Has Her Way (Dark Quest Books) (2011)
 "Best Served Flash-Frozen" - Foreshadows: The Ghosts of Zero (2012)
 "Midnight Knight" - The New Hero (2012)
 "A Girl and Her Scaly Bits" - The Awakened (2013)
 "Fae Blades for the Dread Duke" - By Faerie Light (2013)
 "A Matter of Knives" - Pathfinder Tales (2013)
 "Kheltae's Bright Scheme" - Tournament of Death (2014)
 "The Sword of the Lord" - Arcane Synthesis (2014)
 "Ghosts Galore" - Cadaver Bone (2014)
 "The Dragon" - Gods, Memes, and Monsters (2015)
 "The Magpie" - Gods, Memes, and Monsters (2015)
 "The Haunting of the Lordly Lion" - The Bard's Tale: Stories and Recipes From The Black Dragon Inn (2015)
 "Many Tentacles, Reaching" - The Awakened II (2016)
 "My Doom May Come Soon" - Champions of Aetaltis (2016)
 "Wolves Run By Night" - The Awakened Modern (2017)
 "Under the Queen's Throne" - Art of War (2018)
 "Three Aces for the Dancer" - Rocket Age Anthology 1: Tales of the Solar System (2018)
 "Words to Die For" - Sisterhood of the Blade (2018)
 Creatures from Fairy-Tale and Myth (2019)

Anthologies edited
 When the Hero Comes Home (edited by Ed Greenwood and Gabrielle Harbowy) – Dragon Moon Press (2011)
 When the Villain Comes Home (edited by Ed Greenwood and Gabrielle Harbowy) – Dragon Moon Press (2012)
 Women In Practical Armor (edited by Ed Greenwood and Gabrielle Harbowy) – Evil Girlfriend Media (2017)

 Role-playing games 
 1st edition Dungeons & Dragons Forgotten Realms Campaign Set (1987), a box set of material for running Dungeons & Dragons campaigns set in the Realms; since re-published various times for new editions.
 City System (1988), an extensive collection of maps of the city of Waterdeep.
 5th Edition Dungeons & Dragons The Border Kingdoms: A Forgotten Realms Campaign Supplement with Alex Kammer (Dungeon Masters Guild, June 2018)
 Elminster's Candlekeep Companion with Anthony Joyce, Justice Arman, M.T. Black, Jeremy Forbing, Trevor Armstrong, Laura Hirsbrunner (Dungeon Masters Guild, April 2020)
 Darkhold: Secrets of the Zhentarim with Justice Arman, M.T. Black, Anthony Joyce, Celeste Conowitch, Jeremy Forbing, Sadie Lowry, Noah Grand, Brittney Hay, Gabriel Hicks, Laura Hirsbrunner, Amber Litke, Jessica Marcrum, Kienna Shaw (Dungeon Masters Guild, August 2020)
 Rashemen - Campaign Guide with Joe Raso, Andrew Bishkinskyi, Blaise Wigglesworth, Bryan Holmes, Emily Harmon, Florian Emmerich, Jean Lorber, Karl Resch, Lydia Van Hoy, Steve Fidler, V.J. Harris (Dungeon Masters Guild, September 2021)
 Thay: Land Of The Red Wizards with  Alex Kammer, Alan Patrick (Dungeon Masters Guild, February 2022)

Video games
 J.R.R. Tolkien's The Lord of the Rings, Vol. II: The Two Towers Eye of the Beholder III: Assault on Myth Drannor Pool of Radiance: Ruins of Myth Drannor Haunted Halls of Eveningstar Mages of MystraliaCritical studies and reviews of Greenwood's workThe Iron Assassin 

Media mentions
Ed Greenwood has appeared in the following podcasts, newspaper and magazine articles, websites, and podcasts.

Podcasts
 Open Design No. 004: Dwarves of the Ironcrags. Ed provides the voice for the introduction to this show.
 RPG Countdown: 29 July 2009 episode (Kobold Quarterly 010)
 Dungeon Masters Block: Episode 69 & 70
 Worldcasting: Episode 12 (by Worldbuilding Magazine)

Magazines
 "To Believe the Magic Is Real: A Conversation with Ed Greenwood". Clarkesworld Magazine, December 2008.
 Interview with Ed Greenwood, Cryptych'' Issue 1/IV, February 1994

Radio interviews
 Sounds Like Canada: August 28, 2007 episode

References

External links

Biography of Ed Greenwood at Wizards.com

1959 births
Living people
20th-century Canadian novelists
21st-century Canadian novelists
Canadian fantasy writers
Canadian male novelists
Canadian science fiction writers
Dungeons & Dragons game designers